Lutheran High School, Obot Idim is a Christian high school in Ibesikpo Asutan local government, Akwa Ibom. The school has an average class size of 20 students.

History
Lutheran High School, Obot Idim was established in 1950. Rev. John Louis Konz was the first principal of the school. About 500 candidates took the first-ever entrance examination of the school, and only 28 were successful.

The school kicked off with the 28 successful candidates on the premises of Boechler Memorial Primary School.

Few years after its establishment, the school started seeing an increase in the number of applications. And by 1961, the student population had risen to 348. The number of teachers had also increased. That prompted the Lutheran Church of Nigeria to move the school from the Boechler Memorial Primary School to its present location.

Notable alumni

Politics
 Etim Okpoyo - Former Deputy Governor of Akwa Ibom State
 Onofiok Luke - Member, representating Etinan/Nsit Ibom/Nsit Ubium in the House of Representatives

Academia
 Prof. Akan Williams - former Acting Vice Chancellor, Covenant University

Military
 Air Marshal Nsikak Eduok - Former Chief of Air Staff

References 

Schools in Akwa Ibom State